The Bushmaster XM-15 series (or XM15) is a line of AR-15 style semi-automatic rifles and carbines manufactured by Bushmaster Firearms International, LLC. Variants include the Bushmaster M4-type Carbine, Patrolman series, QRC series, Bushmaster XM15-E2S, and the Carbon 15 line.

Variants
The standard XM-15 has a forged 7075T6 aircraft-grade aluminum upper and lower receiver. Barrels of XM-15 firearms have a heavy profile and are hard chrome-lined 4150 alloy steel or 416 stainless steel. In Bushmaster's 2016 sales brochure, all new-production XM-15s are stated to be supplied with a 4150 steel barrel.  The standard barrel has rifling of 1 turn in 9".
E2S Series: The basic E2S is fitted with a 16-inch carbine-style barrel.
E2S Target - 20" heavy-barrel target rifle with A2-style stock and carry handle upper, also available with 24" and 26" barrels.
E2S Shorty - 16-inch version with a "shorty" handguard.
E2S Shorty AK - Shorty variant with 14.5-inch carbine SBR barrel with an AK-74-style muzzle brake permanently welded to the end to increase the overall length to 16 inches.
E2S Dissipator - Variant with a Bushmaster-designed 16-inch "Dissipator" barrel. This mounts a false gas block with a front sight at the 20" position with the real gas block in the carbine position and concealed under a rifle-length 12" handguard.
QRC Series: Formerly known as ORC ("optics ready carbine"), but now styled as QRC ("quick response carbine"), are flat-top rifles without iron sights, provided with a simple 1x20 red-dot optic. QRC is chambered in 5.56x45mm with a 1:8 twist melonite coated barrel, M16 style bolt carrier group & mil-spec buffer tube.
Patrolman Series: - 7" or 10.5" barrel "pistol" version with a free-float handguard and no stock. Also available as a military or LE select-fire version.
Bushmaster M4-Type Carbine

Carbon 15

Notoriety
The Bushmaster XM15-E2S "M4 type" carbine first gained notoriety for its use in the October 2002 Beltway sniper attacks.

A Bushmaster XM-15 was used in the December 2012 Sandy Hook Elementary School shooting. Just before the two-year anniversary of the massacre, nine families of the 26 victims of the shooting filed a class action lawsuit in Connecticut against Bushmaster, Remington Arms and others, seeking "unspecified" damages for the defendants' purported negligent entrustment and illegal marketing of the XM-15 rifle. Plaintiffs argued that both theories of liability fell within exceptions to the 2005 Protection of Lawful Commerce in Arms Act, which affords broad civil immunity to gun manufacturers. The case was dismissed in superior court and was appealed to the Connecticut Supreme Court. 

In March 2019, the Connecticut Supreme Court reinstated the wrongful death lawsuit, holding that the plaintiffs successfully pleaded a cause of action for illegal marketing. Remington appealed to the United States Supreme Court, which denied review on November 12, 2019. On February 15, 2022, Remington Arms insurers settled with families of Sandy Hook victims and agreed to pay a total of $73 million to families.

An XM-15 was also used in the 1997 North Hollywood shootout, and an XM-15 was used in the 2018 Nashville Waffle House shooting.

An XM15-E2 was captured from Islamic State fighters in Sinjar Mountains by Peshmerga during the Iraqi Civil War.

Legality

As of October 2, 2000, California has banned the Bushmaster XM15 by name in the Kasler v. Lockyer Assault Weapon List, among other AR-style rifles by Armalite, DPMS, Colt, and Eagle Arms, to name a few.

As a result of the Sandy Hook school shooting: 
 New York State banned the Bushmaster XM-15 series and assault weapons in the January 2013 NY SAFE Act.
 The XM-15 series is among over 100 named firearms added to the Connecticut state assault weapon ban list in an April 2013 amendment, passed in the wake of the Sandy Hook school shooting.

Users

 : Federal Police of Brazil
 : New Zealand Police
 
 : Used by JW GROM.

Non-State Actors

 Islamic State of Iraq and the Levant

References

5.56 mm firearms
Rifles of the United States
Semi-automatic rifles
Bushmaster firearms
ArmaLite AR-10 derivatives
AR-15 style rifles